"My Way" is a song from American singer-songwriter Usher's 1997 album of the same name. It features an uncredited rap and background vocals from Jermaine Dupri. The refrain of the song samples "Wanna Be a Baller" by Lil' Troy from his debut album Sittin' Fat Down South, published officially one month before Usher's song.

Music video
It was filmed and released in 1998 at a broken down garage in a desert location. It features a dance competition between two groups, one led by Usher and the other led by Tyrese Gibson.

Release and reception
Despite moderate airplay, the single sold well and reached number two on the U.S. Billboard Hot 100. Due to the disappointment of the "Nice and Slow" single in the United Kingdom, "My Way" was not released as a single there. In 2016, Complex ranked "My Way" number ten on their list of the 25 greatest Usher songs, and in 2021, American Songwriter ranked the song number two on their list of the 10 greatest Usher songs.

Track listing
US 12-inch vinyl
 "My Way" [Remix W/J.D.] 3:37 Rap [Featuring] - Jermaine Dupri
 "My Way" [Remix Instrumental] 3:37
 "My Way" [Remix Acappella] 3:37 Rap [Featuring] - Jermaine Dupri
 "My Way" [Album Version] 3:38
 "My Way" [Instrumental] 3:36
 "My Way" [Acapella]

Charts

Weekly charts

Year-end charts

Decade-end charts

Certifications

Release history

References

1997 songs
1998 singles
Usher (musician) songs
Arista Records singles
LaFace Records singles
Music videos directed by Paul Hunter (director)
Song recordings produced by Jermaine Dupri
Songs written by Jermaine Dupri
Songs written by Manuel Seal